John Peragallo Jr. (1932–2008) was the president of the Peragallo Pipe Organ Company.

References 

20th-century American businesspeople
1932 births
2008 deaths